Wabash County is a county located in the U.S. state of Illinois. According to the 2020 census, it had a population of 11,361. Its county seat is Mount Carmel. It is located in the southern portion of Illinois known locally as "Little Egypt".

History
Wabash County was formed in 1824 out of Edwards County. This averted t an armed confrontation between the militias of Albion and Mt. Carmel after the county seat was moved from a town near the current city of Mount Carmel to Albion.

The county is named for the Wabash River, which forms its eastern and southern borders. The name "Wabash" is an English spelling of the French name for the river, "Ouabache."''' French traders named the river after the Miami Indian word for the river, "Wabashike," (pronounced "Wah-bah-she-keh"), the word for "pure white." Much of the river bottom is white limestone, now obscured by mud.

A  remnant of the county's original Eastern Woodlands ecosystem can be found in the Forest of the Wabash'', located within the county's Beall Woods State Park.

In the 1920s a notable hotel and resort operated in Wabash County nearby the Grand Rapids Dam on the Wabash River.  Named the Grand Rapids Hotel, it was owned by Frederick Hinde Zimmerman.  During the hotel's nine-year existence, it catered to individuals from all over the United States.  In July 2011, John Matthew Nolan published a detailed history of the Grand Rapids Hotel.

Earthquake

On the morning of April 18, 2008, at 4:37am local time, one of the largest earthquakes in Illinois history hit the area. The epicenter of this tremor was in Lick Prairie Township, near the middle of the county. The tremor was felt for a wide radius, more than 400 miles away in Nebraska.

Geography

It is the fifth-smallest county in Illinois by area.

Two rivers, the Wabash River to the east and the Little Wabash River to the west join at the southern tip of the county; the Little Wabash separating the two counties, Wabash County from the Edwards County.

Climate and weather

Major highways
  Illinois Route 1
  Illinois Route 15

Adjacent counties
 Lawrence County - north
 Knox County, Indiana - northeast
 Gibson County, Indiana - south and mostly east
 Edwards County - west
 Richland County - northwest

Demographics

As of the 2010 United States Census, there were 11,947 people, 5,012 households, and 3,310 families residing in the county. The racial makeup of the county was 96.9% white, 0.6% black or African American, 0.6% Asian, 0.2% American Indian, 0.5% from other races, and 1.1% from two or more races. Those of Hispanic or Latino origin made up 1.3% of the population. In terms of ancestry, 25.6% were German, 12.3% were English, 11.7% were American, and 8.4% were Irish.

Of the 5,012 households, 29.0% had children under the age of 18 living with them, 52.9% were married couples living together, 9.3% had a female householder with no husband present, 34.0% were non-families, and 29.4% of all households were made up of individuals. The average household size was 2.37 and the average family size was 2.91. The median age was 42.0 years.

The median income for a household in the county was $46,026 and the median income for a family was $55,611. Males had a median income of $44,932 versus $28,292 for females. The per capita income for the county was $23,350. About 7.2% of families and 13.0% of the population were below the poverty line, including 12.2% of those under age 18 and 8.6% of those age 65 or over.

Communities

Cities
 Mount Carmel (seat)

Villages
 Allendale
 Bellmont
 Keensburg

Unincorporated communities
 Adams Corner
 Cowling
 Friendsville
 Lancaster
 Maud
 Odgen
 Rochester

Precincts
Wabash County is one of 17 Illinois counties that use the term precinct instead of township.

 Bellmont (Bellmont)
 Coffee (Keensburg)
 Compton (East Grayville)
 Friendsville (Friendsville)
 Lancaster (Lancaster)
 Lick Prairie (Lick Prairie)
 Mount Carmel (Mount Carmel)
 Wabash (Allendale)

Wabash County precincts and their boundaries

Politics

See also
 National Register of Historic Places listings in Wabash County
 Grand Rapids Hotel
 Grand Rapids Dam
 Hanging Rock (Wabash River)
 Charles T. Hinde
 Thomas S. Hinde
 Frederick Hinde Zimmerman

References

 
Illinois counties
Illinois placenames of Native American origin
Wabash County, Illinois
1824 establishments in Illinois
Populated places established in 1824